Mike Zuydwijk (born 21 May 1994) is a former Dutch professional darts player who played in the Professional Darts Corporation.

Career

BDO
Zuydwijk would join the BDO in 2011, where the only major BDO event Zuydwijk would qualify for was the 2012 World Masters, making it to the Last 80 against Daryl Gurney in a 3–2 defeat.

PDC
Zuydwijk began playing in PDC in 2014 and won the third Youth Tour event by whitewashing James Hubbard 4–0.
In January 2015, Zuydwijk earned a two-year PDC tour card on the first day at Q School in Wigan. Zuydwick drew three-time world champion John Part in the first round of the 2015 UK Open, winning the match 5–2 to advance to the second round against Keegan Brown in a 5–3 defeat. He made his European Tour debut at the Gibraltar Darts Trophy and edged out Joe Murnan 6–5, before losing 6–4 to Justin Pipe in the second round.

Zuydwijk didn't qualify for the 2016 UK Open, lost in the first round of two European Tour events, and reached the last 32 of two Players Championships.

References

External links
Mike Zuydwijk's Profile and Stats on Darts Database

1994 births
Living people
Dutch darts players
Professional Darts Corporation former tour card holders
Sportspeople from The Hague